Ceromitia iolampra is a moth of the  family Adelidae. It is found in the Australian Capital Territory, New South Wales and Victoria.

The larvae feed on the flowers of Acacia baileyana and Acacia genistifolia. Later instar larvae live on the ground in a portable case made from flower parts or detritus.

External links
Australian Faunal Directory

Moths of Australia
Adelidae
Endemic fauna of Australia
Moths described in 1900
Taxa named by Alfred Jefferis Turner